Chromium(II) hydride, systematically named chromium dihydride and poly­(dihydridochromium) is pale brown solid inorganic compound with the chemical formula  (also written  or ). Although it is thermodynamically unstable toward decomposition at ambient temperatures, it is kinetically metastable.

Chromium(II) hydride is the second simplest polymeric chromium hydride (after chromium(I) hydride). In metallurgical chemistry, chromium(II) hydride is fundamental to certain forms of chromium-hydrogen alloys.

Nomenclature 
The most common name for chromium(II) hydride is chromium dihydride, following the IUPAC compositional nomen­clature.  Because the compositional name does not distinguish between different compounds with stoichiometry , "chromium dihydride" is ambiguous between an unstable molecular species (see ) and the metastable (but common) polymeric form.  When disambiguation is necessary, the IUPAC also recognizes the additive name poly­(dihydridochromium) or the electron-deficient substitutive name poly[chromane(2)] for the polymer.

Monomer 
The chromium(II) hydride monomer, also systematically named chromane(2), is both thermodynamically and kinetically unstable towards autompolymerization at ambient temperature, and so cannot be concentrated.

Chromane(2) is the second simplest molecular chromium hydride (after chromane(1)).  In the presence of pure hydrogen, dihydridochromium readily converts to bis(dihydrogen)dihydridochromium, CrH2(H2)2 in an exothermic reaction.

Properties

Structure 
In diluted chromane(2), the molecules are known to oligomerise forming at least dichromane(4) (dimers), being connected by covalent bonds. The dissociation enthalpy of the dimer is estimated to be 121 kJ mol−1. CrH2 is bent, and is weakly repulsive to one hydrogen molecule, but attractive to two molecules of hydrogen. The bond angle is 118±5°. The stretching force constant is 1.64 mdyn/Å. The dimer has a distorted rhombus structure with C2h symmetry.

Production 
Dichromane(4) is produced synthetically by hydrogenation. In this process, chromium and hydrogen react according to the reaction:
Cr +  → 
This process involves atomic chromium as an intermediate, and occurs in two steps. The hydrogenation (step 2) is a spontaneous process.
Cr (s) → Cr (g)
Cr (g) + (g) → 
In an inert gas matrix atomic Cr reacts with H2 to make the dihydride when it is irradiated with ultraviolet light between 320 and 380 nm. The reaction of chromium with molecular hydrogen is endothermic. 380 nm or greater wavelength radiation is required to procure photochemically generated CrH2.

History 
In 1979 the simplest molecular chromium(II) hydride with the chemical formula  (systematically named chromane(2) and dihydridochromium) was synthesised and identified for the first time. It was synthesised directly from the elements, in a reaction sequence which consisted of simultaneous sublimation of chromium to atomic chromium and thermolysis of hydrogen, and concluded with co-deposition in a cryogenic argon matrix to form chromane(2).

In 2003 the dimer with the chemical formula  (systematically named dichromane(4) and di-μ-hydrido-bis(hydridochromium)) was synthesised and identified for the first time. It was also synthesised directly from the elements, in a reaction sequence which consisted of laser ablation of chromium to atomic chromium, followed by co-deposition with hydrogen in a cryogenic matrix to produce chromane(2), and concluded with annealing to form dichromane(4).

References 

Chromium(II) compounds
Metal hydrides